Purnea College of Engineering is a government-owned engineering college in Purnia district of Bihar, India. It is managed by the Department of Science and Technology, Bihar. College is affiliated with Aryabhatta Knowledge University and approved by All India Council for Technical Education. The college was established in 2017.

Admission 
Admission in the college for four years B.Tech. course is made through UGEAC conducted by Bihar Combined Entrance Competitive Examination Board. To apply for UGEAC, appearing in JEE Main of that admission year is required.

Branches 
College have total of six branches in Bachelor of Technology degree. Civil Engineering, Mechanical Engineering, Electrical Engineering, Electronics and Communication Engineering. Computer science engineering and Computer science engineering with Artificial intelligence

References

External links 
 Official website
 BCECE Board website
 Aryabhatta Knowledge University website
 DST, Bihar website

Engineering colleges in Bihar
Colleges affiliated to Aryabhatta Knowledge University
2017 establishments in Bihar
Educational institutions established in 2017